Yasmin is a 1955 Hindi Black-and-white Costume drama, written, produced and directed by Abdur Rashid Kardar. The film starred Vyjayanthimala in the title role, with Suresh in the lead, while Jayant, Rashid Khan, Maruti Rao, S. N. Banerjee, Shyam Kumar and Rajan Haksar form an ensemble cast. The film was produced at Kardar Studio. The film's score was composed by C. Ramchandra, with lyrics provided by Jan Nisar Akhtar. Editing was done by M. S. Hajee and it was filmed by Dwarka Divecha with the audiography done by Ishan Ghosh. The story is about Ahmad, who is in love with Yasmin.

Plot
A powerful and princely Sheikh lives in 18th Century Persia, makes a living renting out properties, and recovering taxes and dues on them. He lives in a palatial house with his wife, Zubeda, and son, Ahmad. When Ahmad grows up, Zubeda notices that he is spending too much time with women in their harem, and wants his father to get him involved in their business. Sheikh accordingly instructs Ahmad to collect all revenue, which he does so. A few days later, Sheikh is informed that Ahmad has been spending time with a friend named Farid, and is romantically involved with a dancing girl named Yasmin. A visibly upset Sheikh accordingly warns Ahmad to mend his ways, give up on Yasmin and return home, where he has planned his marriage with Nadira, the daughter of Amir Qasim. Ahmad does return home, but refuses to marry Nadira, and runs away from home to be close to Yasmin, knowing fully well that Yasmin is connected with a group of gypsy thugs, who use her charms to lure wealthy young men to extract a ransom. And Ahmad knows that his enraged father will also challenge him to a duel - a duel unto death - that will ensure a death in his family.

Cast
 Vyjayanthimala as Yasmin
 Suresh as Ahmed
 Jayant as Shaikh
 Rashid Khan as Zafar
 Mumtaz Begum as Zubeda

Soundtrack
The music was composed by C. Ramchandra, with the lyrics penned by Jan Nisar Akhtar.

Awards
Filmfare Awards
 Filmfare Award for Best Cinematographer (B&W category) - Dwarka Divecha

References

External links
 
 Yasmin (1955 film) on Muvyz.com website

1955 films
1950s Hindi-language films
Indian historical films
Films directed by A. R. Kardar
Films scored by C. Ramchandra
1955 musical films
Films set in Iran
Indian black-and-white films